Leslie Earl Simon (August 11, 1900 – October 28, 1983) was an American military officer and scientist, and author of the book German Research in World War II: An Analysis of the Conduct of Research. He was a major general in the U.S. Army's Ordnance Department, and director of the Ballistic Research Laboratories at the Aberdeen Proving Ground military facility in Maryland.

Biography
Leslie Earl Simon was born in Memphis, Tennessee on August 11, 1900. He graduated from the United States Military Academy at West Point in 1924, eventually attaining the rank of major general. He received the Distinguished Service Medal in 1956.

He died in Orlando, Florida on October 28, 1983, and was buried at Arlington National Cemetery.

Writing
German Research discusses various German secret weapons of World War II, with an emphasis on airplanes, rocketry and the Germans' research methodology. It was first published in 1947. The book has become a collector's item in Europe since Hergé featured it in the storyline of The Adventures of Tintin comic The Calculus Affair, published in 1956, where it appears on page 23. The book is available, nevertheless, in various versions. Hergé censored the swastika, when he inserted the book.

Selected works

Engineer's Manual of Statistical Methods, 1941, John Wiley and Sons, 
German Research in World War II: An Analysis of the Conduct of Research, 1947, John Wiley.
German Research was also published under the same title in the UK in 1948 by Chapman & Hall, then republished in 1970 as Secret Weapons of the Third Reich: German Research in World War II by Paladin Press .

References

Fellows of the American Statistical Association
1983 deaths
1900 births
United States Military Academy alumni
Tintin
Burials at Arlington National Cemetery
Recipients of the Distinguished Service Medal (US Army)
United States Army generals